Kotoka may refer to:

 Emmanuel Kwasi Kotoka, member of the ruling National Liberation Council of Ghana 
 Kotoka International Airport, in Accra, Ghana
 Kotooka, Akita (also transliterated as Kotoka), a town in Yamamoto District, Akita, Japan